Lennox County is a historic county in  the Canadian province of Ontario which now forms part of Lennox and Addington County. It was named after Charles Lennox, 3rd Duke of Richmond.

Its territory is the same as what now composes the town of Greater Napanee.

Historical evolution
The county of Lennox, situated within the Mecklenburg District, was originally created as an electoral district for the Legislative Assembly of Upper Canada in 1792 and its original limits were described as being:

Mecklenburg was renamed as the "Midland District" in 1792.

It was combined with Addington County and Amherst Island in 1800 to become  the incorporated counties of Lennox and Addington. The counties would regain their separate identities in 1845, but would continue to be united for electoral purposes.

At the beginning of 1850, Midland District was abolished, and the United Counties of Frontenac, Lennox and Addington replaced it for municipal and judicial purposes. In 1860, Lennox and Addington were formally amalgamated as the County of Lennox and Addington.

Historical townships
 Adolphustown Township - The township is now part of Greater Napanee.
 North Fredericksburgh Township - The township is now part of Greater Napanee.
 Richmond Township - The township is now part of Greater Napanee.
 South Fredericksburgh Township - The township is now part of Greater Napanee.

See also
 Census geographic units of Canada
 List of census divisions of Ontario
 List of townships in Ontario

Further reading
 Meacham, J.H.  Illustrated Historical Atlas of Frontenac, Lennox, and Addington Counties.  Toronto, 1878; reprint ed., Belleville: Mika, 1971.

References

External links
County of Lennox and Addington in 1951

Former counties in Ontario
History of Lennox and Addington County
States and territories established in 1792